Raouf Hannachi is a Tunisian born Canadian citizen who served as the Muezzin at Assuna Mosque in Montreal. He was captured by the United States government and turned over to Tunisian officials in October 2001 and jailed.

Hannachi became a Canadian citizen in 1986, and lived in Montreal with his wife.

Hannachi was an active al-Qaeda member. Hannachi returned from Afghanistan towards the end of the summer of 1997, where he had trained for jihad at Khalden Camp. He told Ahmed Ressam about the experience and jihad, encouraged him to train as well, and ultimately arranged a trip to the camp for Ressam and his roommate Mustapha Labsi.

When Abu Zubaydah was waterboarded by American intelligence officers, he offered up Hannachi's name among the hundreds of others he listed as conspirators.

His Montreal apartment was wiretapped by the Canadian Security Intelligence Service (CSIS), who dubbed his circle of friends BOG, Bunch of Guys, and joked that they were like "terrorist tupperware parties" in their boastful talk and lack of any true threat. One of them, however, was Ahmed Ressam, the al-Qaeda member known as the Millennium bomber who attempted to blow up the Los Angeles International Airport.

See also
Faker Boussora

References 

Year of birth missing (living people)
Living people
Canadian Muslims
Tunisian emigrants to Canada
People from Montreal